Vaughan Roderick (born 5 June 1957) is a Welsh radio and television journalist and news presenter.

Television
Roderick is BBC Cymru Wales' editor for Welsh affairs on Wales Today and S4C's Newyddion respectively, having previously anchored the latter during the 1980s and 1990s.

Roderick has presented the programme CF99 and regularly contributes to Sunday Politics Wales and the Welsh Election coverages.

Radio
Roderick also presents Sunday Supplement for BBC Radio Wales and Dros Ginio for BBC Radio Cymru.

References

External links
 BBC Blog
 Twitter Profile
 Institute on Welsh Affairs

1957 births
Living people
Journalists from Cardiff
Welsh-speaking journalists
Welsh television journalists
BBC Cymru Wales newsreaders and journalists
BBC newsreaders and journalists
BBC Radio Wales presenters